Daisy State Park is a  Arkansas state park in Pike County, Arkansas in the United States. The park at the foothills of the Ouachita Mountains features Lake Greeson, a  fishing lake constructed by the United States Army Corps of Engineers in 1950. The park is surrounded by timberlands and is located near the Ouachita National Forest.

See also
 Cossatot River State Park-Natural Area
 Crater of Diamonds State Park

References

State parks of Arkansas
Protected areas of Pike County, Arkansas